Borlongan is a surname. Notable people with the surname include:

Elmer Borlongan (born 1967), Filipino painter
Teodoro Borlongan (1955–2005), Filipino businessman